Christian Astrup (1909–1983) was a Norwegian economist, forester and politician for Nasjonal Samling.

Astrup was born in Solør. From October 1944 he served as acting Minister of Social Affairs in the Quisling regime, the puppet government headed by Vidkun Quisling during the German occupation of Norway, while Johan Andreas Lippestad was absent as responsible for the evacuation of Finnmark. Astrup was sentenced to eight years forced labor in the legal purge in Norway after World War II.

References

1909 births
1983 deaths
People from Solør
Norwegian economists
Members of Nasjonal Samling
People convicted of treason for Nazi Germany against Norway
Norwegian prisoners and detainees